Arle Court Transport Hub (previously known as Arle Court Park and Ride) is a park and ride facility on the outskirts of Cheltenham, England.

History 
From 13 May 2019, drivers have been required to enter their car registration number to receive a parking ticket which must be scanned on a bus service. The change was introduced to prevent people from parking at the facility and walking to nearby businesses, leaving no spaces available for bus users.

In March 2020 due to the COVID-19 pandemic, route 93 was withdrawn, with route 94 being diverted to serve the facility instead. Later that year, sixty car parking spaces were removed to make room for a construction compound. The compound will be used for the widening of the adjacent A40 road.

Facilities 
The park and ride has parking for both cars and bicycles.

Services 
Stagecoach West took over bus services on 14 May 2018. Previously, it was operated by Bennetts. After 27 November 2022, services will again be operated by Bennetts.

From August 2017, service 99 began calling at the park and ride. It runs from Gloucester Transport Hub to the centre of Cheltenham via Gloucestershire Royal Hospital and Cheltenham General Hospital.

Future plans 
In July 2021, Gloucestershire County Council announced plans to upgrade the park and ride facility at a cost of £20 million. The plans include a waiting room, secure bicycle parking, 100 electric vehicle charging points, and solar panels to power the site. A multistorey car park would also be built which would double the number of car parking spaces at the facility.

References

External links 

 Arle Court Transport Hub Gloucestershire County Council

Park and ride schemes in the United Kingdom